Rafał Krzysztof Sonik (born 3 June 1966 in Kraków, Poland) is a Polish quad rally driver. He is the second Polish driver to win the Dakar Rally (2015). Before that, he had claimed the second and twice the third place. He won the FIM World Cup three times, and is a five-time Polish Champion winner in endurance racing (2K class – quads with rear-wheel drive).

Career

Season 2020 
3rd place in the Dakar Rally

Season 2017 
4th place in the Dakar Rally

Season 2015 
1st place in the Dakar Rally

Season 2014 
Winner of the World Cup Cross-Country Quads classification
2nd place in the Dakar Rally
1st place in the Abu Dhabi Desert Challenge
2nd place in the Qatar Rally
1st place in the Faraon's Rally
1st place in the Sardinia Rally
2nd place in the Brasil Rally
1st place in the Marocco Rally

Season 2013 
2nd place in the World Cup FIM Cross-Country Quads classification. 
3rd place in the Dakar Rally
3rd place in the Abu Zabi Rally
1st place in the Qatar Rally
1st place in the Sardinia Rally
1st place in the Argentina Rally
4th place in the Brasil Rally
1st place in the Marocco Rally

Season 2012 
4th place in the Dakar Rally
2nd place in the World Cup FIM Cross-Country Quads classification.  
8th place in the Abu Zabi Rally
1st place in the Qatar Rally
2nd place in the Sardinia Rally
2nd place in the Egyptian Rally

Season 2011 
Dakar – unfinished due to an injury which eliminated him from the whole 2011 season.

Season 2010 
V place in the Dakar Rally
Winner of the World Cup Cross-Country Quads classification
2nd place in the Faraon Rally
1st place in the Brasil Rally
2nd place in the Sardinia Rally
1st place in the Tunisia Rally
4th place in the Abu Dhabi Desert Challenge

Season 2009 
3rd place in the Dakar Rally
During the 1st qualifiers to the World Cup - Abu Dhabi Desert Challenge - Sonik has broken his hand making it impossible for him to continue in the next WC rounds.
21st place in the "12 hours of Pont de Vaux"

Season 2008 
Polish Champion title in the Enduro Rally class 2K
3rd place in the  w Quad Cross Country Polish Championship class 2K
30th place in the "12 hours of Pont de Vaux"

Season 2007 
Polish Champion title in the Enduro Rally class 2K
4th place in the Polish Motor Association Cup in Quad Cross Country class 2K
5th place in the Quad Golden Cup

Season 2006 
Due to a collision with another driver on the Endurance Rally in May 2006 Sonik has suffered severe injuries. He has gone through several complicated operations which caused him to be eliminated from the further competitions in 2006.

Season 2005 
Polish Champion title in the Enduro Rally class 2K
Polish Champion in the Quad Motocross, class Open.
1st in the Quad Silver Cup.
1st in the Polish Quad Cross-Country Cup.
1st start in the "12 hours of Pont de Vaux" 2005 (Honda TRX 450R).

Season 2004 
Polish Champion title in the Enduro Rally class 2K
Silesian Cross-Country Quad Champion class Open (Mistrz Śląska w Country Crossie Quadów, klasa Open).

Season 2003 
Polish Champion title in the Enduro Rally class 2K
Silesian Cross-Country Quad Champion class 2K.
2nd place in the Polish Motor Association Cup in Quad Cross Country class Open.
start w "12 hours of Pont de Vaux" 2003 (Yamaha Banshee).

Season 2002 
1st place in the Polish Speedway Quad Club Cup 2002. 
4th place in the Polish Motor Association Enduro Cup class 2K.
27th place in "12 hours of Pont de Vaux" 2002 (Yamaha Raptor 660).

Season 2001 
3rd place in the  Polish Motor Association Enduro Cup class 2K.

References

Living people
1966 births
Sportspeople from Kraków
Polish rally drivers
Dakar Rally drivers
Dakar Rally winning drivers